The 2005 Rutgers Scarlet Knights football team represented Rutgers University in the 2005 NCAA Division I FBS football season. The Scarlet Knights were led by fifth-year head coach Greg Schiano and played their home games at Rutgers Stadium. They are a member of the Big East Conference. They finished the season 7–5, 4–3 in Big East play to finish in a tie for third place. After the season, they were invited to their first Bowl game since 1978. They would lose 45–40 to the Arizona State Sun Devils in the Insight Bowl.

Schedule

References

Rutgers
Rutgers Scarlet Knights football seasons
Rutgers Scarlet Knights football